Richard Jones  (born 1879) was a Welsh international footballer. He was part of the Wales national football team, playing 2 matches. He played his first match on 3 March 1906 against Scotland  and his last match on 2 April 1906 against Ireland. At club level, he played for Millwall Athletic and Manchester City.

See also
 List of Wales international footballers (alphabetical)

References

1879 births
Place of birth missing
Date of death missing
Year of death missing
Welsh footballers
Wales international footballers
Millwall F.C. players
Manchester City F.C. players
Association footballers not categorized by position